Duarte Almeida Arrugo Figueiredo (born 25 June 1982) is a Portuguese rugby union footballer. He plays as a prop, for Centro Desportivo Universitário de Lisboa (CDUL).

He had 7 caps for Portugal, from 2007 to 2008. He was called for the 2007 Rugby World Cup. He played a single game at the 31-5 loss to Italy, as substitute.

References

External links

1982 births
Living people
Portuguese rugby union players
Portugal international rugby union players
Rugby union props